The PF2 Platform (Before N platform) is an automobile platform developed by engineers of the French automotive group PSA Peugeot Citroën. The platform is designed for medium cars with front wheel drive or four wheel drive coupled with electric engine and transverse engine. The first application using the PF2 platform is the 2001 Peugeot 307.

The platform is being phased out from 2013 with the replacement PSA EMP2 platform, which merges the PF2 and PF3 platforms into one new modular system.

Models
Vehicles based on the PF2 Platform:
 Regular
 2001-2008 Peugeot 307, essentially mix of 306/Xsara/ZX and PF2 platform
 2004-2010 Citroën C4
 2007-2013 Peugeot 308
 2009-2016 Peugeot 3008
 2009-2012 Citroën C4 Sedan (C-Quatre)
 2010-2015 Peugeot RCZ
 2010-2018 Citroën C4 II
 2011-2018 Citroën DS4
 2015-2018 DS 4
 2016-2018 DS 4 Crossback
 2016-2018 DongFeng H30 Cross
 2014-2020 DS 6 (China)

 Extended
 2002-2008 Peugeot 307 SW
 2006-2013 Citroën C4 Picasso
 2006-2013 Citroën C4 Sedan (C-Triomphe/Pallas)
 2008-2018 Citroën Berlingo
 2008-2018 Peugeot Partner
 2008-2014 Peugeot 308 SW
 2009-2016 Peugeot 5008
 2010-2014 Peugeot 408
 2011-2018 Citroën DS5
 2015-2018 DS 5
 2012 Citroën C4 II L

PSA platforms